Nishiyama Dam is a gravity dam located in Yamanashi Prefecture in Japan. The dam is used for power production. The catchment area of the dam is 192 km2. The dam impounds about 24  ha of land when full and can store 2382 thousand cubic meters of water. The construction of the dam was started on 1954 and completed in 1957.

References

Dams in Yamanashi Prefecture
1957 establishments in Japan